The Chumysh is a river in Russia, a right branch of the Ob River. It enters the Ob  downriver from Barnaul. The Chumysh begins at the confluence of the Kara-Chumysh and the Tom-Chumysh rivers in Kemerovo Oblast.

About 68 percent of its right-side basin is known as the Salair Ridge and the Pre-Salair plains.

Main tributaries

Left
Kara-Chumysh, length 
Sary-Chumysh, length 
Kashkaragaikha, length 
Taraba, length 
Yama, length 
Angurep, length

Right
Tom-Chumysh, length 
Uksunay, length 
Alambay, length 
Sungay, length  
Talmenka, length 
Kamenka, length

References

Rivers of Kemerovo Oblast
Rivers of Altai Krai